The 1903 Latrobe Athletic Association season was their eighth season in existence. It was a low profile season for Latrobe. The team  finished 9–0. Latrobe laid claim to the western Pennsylvania championship after the undefeated season. However, the Franklin Athletic Club was generally considered the 1903 U.S. Pro Football Champions, even though they had refused to play Latrobe.

Schedule

Game notes

References

Latrobe Athletic Association
Latrobe Athletic Association seasons